Dexter Joeng Woo Lembikisa (born 4 November 2003) is a professional footballer who plays as a right-back for Wolverhampton Wanderers. Born in England, he plays for the Jamaica national team.

Club career
Lembikisa joined Wolverhampton Wanderers' youth academy at the age of 13, and worked his way up their youth categories. On 10 November 2021, he signed his first professional contract with Wolves and promoted to their reserves in 2021. He started training with their senior team in the summer of 2022. He made his professional debut with Wolves as a late substitute with Wolves in a 1-0 EFL Cup tie with Leeds United on 9 November 2022.

International career
Lembikisa was born in England to a Congolese father and Jamaican mother. He was called up to represent the Jamaica U20s for the 2022 CONCACAF U-20 Championship. He debuted for the senior Jamaica national team in a friendly 1-0 loss to Trinidad and Tobago on 11 March 2023.

Career statistics

Club

International

Notes

References

External links
 Profile at the Wolverhampton Wanderers F.C. website
 

2003 births
Living people
People from South Gloucestershire District
Jamaican footballers
Jamaica international footballers
English footballers
Jamaican people of Democratic Republic of the Congo descent
English sportspeople of Jamaican descent
English sportspeople of Democratic Republic of the Congo descent
Association football fullbacks
Wolverhampton Wanderers F.C. players
Premier League players